Bebop Lives! is a live album by saxophonist Frank Morgan which was recorded at the Village Vanguard in 1986 and released on the Contemporary label.

Reception

The review by Allmusic's  Scott Yanow said: "Altoist Frank Morgan pays tribute to his bebop beginnings on this live set from the Village Vanguard  ... The music often swings hard, and Morgan, although initially influenced strongly by Charlie Parker, sounds quite original, pushing at the tradition".

Track listing 
 "What Is This Thing Called Love?" (Cole Porter) – 9:02
 "Parker's Mood" (Charlie Parker) – 8:12
 "Well, You Needn't" (Thelonious Monk) – 8:04
 "Little Melonae" (Jackie McLean) – 9:13
 "Come Sunday" (Duke Ellington) – 3:25
 "All the Things You Are" (Jerome Kern, Oscar Hammerstein II) – 11:57	
 "A Night in Tunisia" (Dizzy Gillespie, Frank Paparelli) – 10:13 Additional track on CD release

Personnel

Performance
Frank Morgan – alto saxophone
Johnny Coles – flugelhorn
Cedar Walton – piano
Buster Williams – bass
Billy Higgins – drums

Production
Richard Bock – producer
Tom Mark – engineer

References 

Frank Morgan (musician) live albums
1987 live albums
Contemporary Records live albums
Albums recorded at the Village Vanguard
Albums produced by Richard Bock (producer)